The Road Home is a South Korean daily drama starring Lee Sang-woo, Jang Shin-young, Shim Hyung-tak, Jo Yeo-jeong, Park Hye-won and Ryohei Otani. It aired on KBS1 from January 12 to June 26, 2009 on Mondays to Fridays at 20:25 for 120 episodes.

Plot
A simple yet heartwarming story of a three-generation family, The Road Home portrays the love and conflicts between family members running a general hospital. It explores the lives of the grown-up children who each have their own problems to solve, and the way they cope with their aging parents.

Yoo Min-soo is the eldest son of the hospital's CEO. His wife Jang Mi-ryung bears a child out of wedlock but raises it with maternal love.

Hiro, a Japanese model, confesses his love for Ji-soo, Min-soo's sister. But Ji-soo must later come to grips with the secrets behind her birth.

Cast
Yoo family
Lee Sang-woo as Yoo Hyun-soo
Park Hye-won as Yoo Ji-soo (sister)
Shim Hyung-tak as Yoo Min-soo (brother, doctor)
Jang Yong as Yoo Yong-joon (father, doctor)
Youn Yuh-jung as Bam Soon-jung (mother, doctor)
Park Geun-hyung as Yoo Keon-young (the great grandfather)
Jo Yeo-jeong as Jang Mi-ryung (Min-soo's wife)
Yoo Yeon-mi as Yoo Eun-ji (Min-soo and Mi-ryung's daughter)
Cha Jae-dol as Yoo Hyun (Min-soo and Mi-ryung's son)

Park family
Im Ye-jin as Yoo Yong-sun (Hyun-soo's aunt)
Lee Dae-yeon as Park Chil-nam (husband)
Kim So-young as Park Shin-ae (daughter)

Han family
Jang Shin-young as Han Suin
Kim Yoo-ri as Han Sumi (sister)
Choi Min-hwan as Han Joo-ho (brother)
Han Jin-hee as Han Dae-hoon (father)
Lee Bo-hee as Oh Seon-young (mother)

Extended cast

Ryohei Otani as Hiro
Ban Hyo-jung as Gook Hyo-soon (Keon-young's friend)
Jung Jae-soon as Jang Yoon-joo
Kim Byung-sun as Song Jin-kyung
Yang Hee-kyung as Mi-ryung's mother
Kim Joo-hwan as Hwang Sung-tae
Yoo Hyung-kwan as Oh Young-gil
Jung Soo-young as Kim Min-kyung
Seo Hoo as Bae Hyung-tae
Min Joon-hyun as doctor
Lee Tae-seung as model
Cha Ji-yeon
Kang Cho-hee
Lee Jin-wook (cameo, ep 21-22)

Awards and nominations

References

External links
 
 

Korean Broadcasting System television dramas
2009 South Korean television series debuts
2009 South Korean television series endings
Korean-language television shows
South Korean romance television series